Hector Harold Whitlock (16 December 1903 – 27 December 1985) was a British athlete who competed mainly in the 50 kilometre walk. He attended Hendon School, then Hendon County School, in North London, where he planted in 1936 an oak tree sapling presented to him, along with his gold medal, by Adolf Hitler at the Olympic Games.

Whitlock won his first national title in 1933. Two years later, he set a new world record for a 30-mile walk, finishing in 4 hours, 29 minutes, 31.8 seconds. In the same year, he also became the first recorded man to walk between London and Brighton in under eight hours.

His main achievement came in 1936, where he won the gold medal in the 50 kilometre walk at the Summer Olympics held in Berlin, Germany, representing Great Britain, finishing in a time of 4 hours, 30 minutes, 41.4 seconds. He gained this victory despite being affected by sickness about 38 kilometres into the race. This sickness, apparently food-related, also affected his fellow British competitors Tebbs Lloyd Johnson and Joe Hopkins.

During the 1936 Olympics, oak saplings were given to gold medallists. Rather than planting the oak in his garden, Whitlock offered his as a gift to his former school, Hendon School. The oak remained at the school until 2007, when it had to be removed due to a dangerous amount of rot.

He continued to represent Britain at international level until 1952, when he came 11th at the Helsinki Olympics behind his younger brother Rex, who finished fourth. Competing at the age of 48, Harold Whitlock was Britain's oldest ever international athlete.

After this, Whitlock continued as a coach and judge. Notably, he coached Don Thompson, who won gold in the 50 kilometre walking event at the 1960 Olympics. Thompson would eventually take over his world record for the 30 miles (50 kilometre) walk. Whitlock also served as an official at those same Olympics.

He died on 27 December 1985 at the age of 82. In 2011, he was inducted into the England Athletics Hall of Fame.

References

1903 births
1985 deaths
Athletes (track and field) at the 1936 Summer Olympics
Athletes (track and field) at the 1952 Summer Olympics
Olympic athletes of Great Britain
English Olympic medallists
Olympic gold medallists for Great Britain
European Athletics Championships medalists
People from Hendon
Athletes from London
English male racewalkers
World record setters in athletics (track and field)
Medalists at the 1936 Summer Olympics
Olympic gold medalists in athletics (track and field)
British masters athletes